WRVY-FM (100.5 FM) is a radio station licensed to Henry, Illinois, United States.  The station airs a country music format, and is currently owned by Fletcher Ford, through licensee Virden Broadcasting Corp.

History 
The station went on air in July 1990 and was owned by The 29th Broadcasting Company of Ridgway, Colorado. Local talent operated the station until it abruptly went off the air in October 1991 The station was then purchased by WCIC (an Illinois Bible Institute radio station) as a translator station in June 1992  The station was then purchased by current owner WZOE, a radio station in neighboring Princeton, Illinois.

References

External links
WRVY-FM's website

RVY
RVY
Country radio stations in the United States